Blancafort is a commune in the Cher department in the Centre-Val de Loire region of France.

Geography
The commune has a border with the department of Loiret. A canal was built here in the nineteenth century to ease drainage and provide transport links. The canal de Sauldre was last used commercially in the 1920s.

Population

Sights

 The church of St. Andre, dating from the eleventh century.
 The twelfth-century chapel.
 The fifteenth-century chateau of Blancafort.
 The twelfth-century chateau de l'Hospital-du-Fresne.
 A museum of witchcraft.
 A public washhouse.

See also
Communes of the Cher department

References

External links

Website of the château de Blancafort
Museum of witchcraft

Communes of Cher (department)